Close Your Eyes is jazz singer Stacey Kent's debut album, released in 1997 by Candid Records.

It was produced by Alan Bates and features her husband, tenor saxophonist Jim Tomlinson. Kent celebrated the release of Close your Eyes with a performance at the Birdland jazz club in New York City in September 1997. Close Your Eyes was the best-selling British jazz album of 1997.

In an interview with Billboard magazine to promote the album Kent said: "With this album, I was trying to give a mixture of things that people know and gems that got lost, songs that might get missed out of the great standard repertoire."

Reception

Scott Yanow, writing on Allmusic.com, gave the album three stars out of five. In his review Yanow said: "Stacey Kent has a very appealing voice, and her delivery is full of joy, enthusiasm, and subtle creativity....Jim Tomlinson contributes some tenor solos reminiscent in tone of Stan Getz, and pianist David Newton and guitarist Colin Oxley also get some solo space." Yanow concluded by calling Kent "a voice to look for in the future".

Track listing 
 "More Than You Know" (Edward Eliscu, Billy Rose, Vincent Youmans) - 5:30
 "Dream Dancing" (Cole Porter) - 4:21
 "Close Your Eyes" (Bernice Petkere) - 5:19
 "There's a Lull in My Life" (Mack Gordon, Harry Revel) - 4:22
 "Its Delovely" (Porter) - 3:21
 "There's No You" (Tom Adair, Hal Hopper) - 6:09
 "I'm Old Fashioned" (Jerome Kern, Johnny Mercer) - 2:53
 "You Go to My Head" (J. Fred Coots, Haven Gillespie) - 7:01
 "Little White Lies" (Walter Donaldson) - 4:10
 "Sleep Warm" (Alan Bergman, Marilyn Bergman, Lew Spence) - 4:30
 "Day In - Day Out" (Rube Bloom, Mercer) - 5:45

Personnel 
Performance
 Stacey Kent – vocals, arranger
 Jim Tomlinson - tenor saxophone, arranger
 David Newton - piano
 Colin Oxley - guitar, arranger
 Andrew Cleyndert - double bass
 Steve Brown - drums
Production
 Curtis Schwartz - engineer, mixing
 Alan Bates - producer
 Humphrey Lyttelton - liner notes

References 

1997 debut albums
Stacey Kent albums
Candid Records albums